East Bay High School is a public high school in Gibsonton, Florida. It was chartered in 1957 on Big Bend Road in Gibsonton. The school's current facility was established in 1972 on a new campus adjacent to the east of the old one. Its former campus is now the campus of Eisenhower Middle School.

Demographics
East Bay HS is 34.4% Hispanic, 28.8% White, 26.9% Black, 2.6% Asian, 0.2% Native American, and 7.0% multiracial.

References

External links 
 East Bay High School website

High schools in Hillsborough County, Florida
Public high schools in Florida
1957 establishments in Florida
Educational institutions established in 1957